Flora of Australia is a 59 volume series describing the vascular plants, bryophytes and lichens present in Australia and its external territories. The series is published by the Australian Biological Resources Study who estimate that the series when complete will describe over 20 000 plant species. It was orchestrated by Alison McCusker.

Series
Volume 1 of the series was published in 1981, a second extended edition was released in 1999. The series uses the Cronquist system of taxonomy. The ABRS also published the Fungi of Australia, the Algae of Australia and  the Flora of Australia Supplementary Series. A new online Flora of Australia was launched by ABRS in 2017, and no more printed volumes will be published.

Volumes published 
1.  Introduction (1st edition)  1981
1.  Introduction (2nd edition)  1999

Other Australian floras
A few censuses of the Australian flora have been carried out, they include
1793-95 - J. E. Smith - A Specimen of the Botany of New Holland
1804-05 - J. E. Smith - Exotic Botany
1804-07 - J. J. H. de Labillardière - Novae Hollandiae Plant. Spec
1810 - R. Brown - Prodromus Florae Novae Hollandiae et Insulae Van Diemen
1814 - R. Brown - Botanical Appendix to Flinders' Voyage
1849 - R. Brown - Botanical Appendix to C. Sturt, Narrative of an Expedition into Central Australia
1856 - J. D. Hooker - Introductory Essay, Flora Tasmaniae
1863-78 - G. Bentham - Flora Australiensis
1882 - F. Mueller - Systematic Census of Australian Plants
1889 - F. Mueller - Second Systematic Census
1990 - R. J. Hnatiuk - Census of Australian Vascular Plants

See also
Flora of Australia
Systematic Census of Australian Plants

References

External links
Flora of Australia online

Botany in Australia
Books about Australian natural history
Australia
F01
Online botany databases
Publications established in 1981
1981 establishments in Australia